Prairie Creek is the Redwood Creek tributary drainage basin including the inland portion of Prairie Creek Redwoods State Park. Prairie Creek drains southerly through a Plio-Pleistocene non-marine sedimentary and metasedimentary formation to a confluence with Redwood Creek approximately one mile upstream of Orick, California. The southern half of the channel exposes the Franciscan Assemblage and the lower reaches flow through Quaternary alluvium of the Redwood Creek estuarine floodplain. Prairie Creek was closely followed by U.S. Route 101 from Orick to the Klamath River drainage divide.  The former highway alignment through the park has been designated the Newton B. Drury Scenic Parkway; through traffic now follows a new alignment along the easterly drainage basin headwall.

References

See also
List of rivers in California

Rivers of Humboldt County, California
Rivers of Northern California